These are the Billboard Top R&B/Hip-Hop Albums that peaked at number-one in 2001.

Chart history

See also
2001 in music
R&B number-one hits of 2001 (USA)

2001